Carolina Kostner (born 8 February 1987) is an Italian figure skater. She is the 2014 Olympic bronze medalist, the 2012 World champion, a five-time European champion (2007–2008, 2010, 2012–2013), and the 2011 Grand Prix Final champion. She is also a medalist at five other World Championships (2005, 2008, 2011, 2013–14), six other European Championships (2006, 2009, 2011, 2014, 2017, 2018), and three other Grand Prix Finals (2007, 2008, 2010), the 2003 World Junior bronze medalist, and a nine-time Italian national champion. Kostner has won 11 medals at the European championships, most recently in 2018, and is the most decorated singles skater in the history of the competition.

Personal life
Carolina Kostner was born in Bolzano, Italy, and lives in Urtijëi (Ortisei/St. Ulrich). She is one of three children of Patrizia, a nationally ranked figure skater in the 1970s and later a geometric arts teacher, and Erwin, who played ice hockey for the Italian national team at the World Championships and Olympic Games before becoming an ice hockey coach. One of her grandfathers was the director of the Art Academy in her hometown. She has two brothers, one year older Martin and three years younger Simon Kostner, who plays ice hockey for Ritten Sport in Ritten, Italy. Kostner is the cousin and goddaughter of Isolde Kostner, a silver medalist in alpine skiing at the 2002 Winter Olympics.

Kostner's native language is Ladin, and she is also fluent in German, Italian, English, and French. In autumn 2007, she enrolled at the University of Turin. She studied art history mainly through correspondence courses. During her suspension from competition, she attended a classical ballet school.

Kostner was formerly in a relationship with former Olympic race walking champion Alex Schwazer.

Career

Early career
Kostner began learning to skate as a four-year-old. She said in 2011, "Half of my family on my dad's side is in sports, and my mother's side is more involved in arts. For me, figure skating was a good mix of the two." When a landslide destroyed her home rink in 2001, Kostner chose to work with Michael Huth in Oberstdorf, Germany – about a four-hour drive from her home in Bolzano.

2002–2003 season 
Making her senior international debut, Kostner won gold at two September events, the 2002 Nebelhorn Trophy and 2002 Ondrej Nepela Memorial. In January, she finished fourth at the 2003 European Championships in Malmö, Sweden. In March, she became the first Italian skater to medal at Junior Worlds. Ranked first in her qualifying group, first in the short program, and fifth in the free skate, she took bronze at the 2003 World Junior Championships in Ostrava, Czech Republic.

2003–2004 season 
In the 2003–2004 season, Kostner finished 5th at the 2004 European Championships and at the 2004 World Championships.

2004–2005 season 
Kostner finished 7th at the 2005 European Championships before beating Michelle Kwan for the bronze medal at the 2005 World Championships in Moscow.

2005–2006 season 
Kostner won her first European medal in 2006, and was chosen to be flag bearer for the host Italian team during the opening ceremony of the 2006 Winter Olympics. At the Olympics, she placed 9th. The next month, at the 2006 World Championships, she placed 12th.

2006–2007 season 
Kostner missed the 2006–2007 Grand Prix season due to injury. She won the Italian national title and went on to win her first European title at the 2007 European Championships. She set a new personal best to finish third in the short program at the 2007 Worlds but faltered in the long program and finished 6th overall.

2007–2008 season 
Kostner medaled at both her Grand Prix events and went to the Grand Prix Final for the first time. At that event, she won the bronze medal. She won her second European title at the 2008 Europeans after winning the short program and placing second in the free skate. At the 2008 Worlds, Kostner won the short program and placed third in the free skate, winning the silver medal overall.

2008–2009 season 

Kostner finished off the podium at her first Grand Prix event, 2008 Skate Canada, lost her European title to Laura Lepistö, and finished 12th at the 2009 World Championships after a long program in which she failed to land a single clean triple. As a result, Italy qualified only one ladies spot for the 2010 Olympics. After eight years of training with coach Michael Huth, Kostner made a coaching change in the summer of 2009, relocating to El Segundo, California to work with Frank Carroll and Christa Fassi, the widow of the late Carlo Fassi.

2009–2010 season 
Kostner placed 6th at both of her Grand Prix events, the 2009 Trophée Eric Bompard and the 2009 Cup of China. In the middle of the season, she left Carroll but continued training with Christa Fassi, and in Pinerolo, Italy with Edoardo De Bernardis. In December 2009, Kostner lost her national title to Valentina Marchei, which threatened her spot on the Italian team for the Vancouver Games, but the following month she rebounded to win gold at the 2010 European Championships, held in Tallinn, Estonia. At the 2010 Olympic Winter Games, she finished 16th overall after a disastrous 19th place free skate. She was able to finish the season on a better note by placing 6th at the 2010 World Championships, which took place in Turin, near her hometown. In 2011, Kostner said that her bad experience at the Olympics led her to question whether she should continue skating, but that she came to realize that she loved skating.

2010–2011 season 
Feeling homesick being far from home, Kostner returned to Oberstdorf and resumed training with Huth in July 2010.

For the 2010–2011 Grand Prix season, Kostner was assigned to the 2010 NHK Trophy and to the 2010 Skate America. During the season, she had a left knee injury. As a result, she did not practice the flip and lutz until the end of 2010. Nevertheless, she was the bronze medalist at Skate America and won the NHK trophy for the second time in her career. At the 2010–11 Grand Prix Final, Kostner placed second in the short program and fourth in the long, winning the silver medal. She also won the silver medal at the 2011 European Championships, where she had a difficult short program but won the free skate. Between the Europeans and Worlds, she took part in the Gardena Spring Trophy, which she won. At the 2011 Worlds in Moscow, Kostner was sixth in the short program but won the bronze medal after a personal-best free skate. It was her first podium finish at Worlds since 2008 and her third overall; she had won her first Worlds medal, also a bronze, in Moscow six years prior. After winning medals at all of her events in 2010–11, Kostner finished atop the ISU season standings. She underwent physiotherapy and took a two-and-a-half month break from skating, returning to training in mid-July.

2011–2012 season 
As a top-six finisher at the 2011 Worlds, Kostner was allowed to compete in three Grand Prix events in 2011. She elected to do so and was assigned to Skate America, the Cup of China, and the Trophée Eric Bompard. She was the silver medalist at Skate America and won the Cup of China, thus becoming the first skater to qualify for the Grand Prix Final. Kostner then won the silver medal at the Trophée Eric Bompard. In an interview after the event, she stated that her knee was fully recovered and her goal was to include more difficult jumps in the 2012 ISU championships. Kostner posted season's-best scores in the short program (66.43) and the free program (121.05) to win her first-ever gold medal at the Grand Prix Final; her overall score of 187.48 was a new personal best. She is the first Italian single skater to become a Grand Prix Final champion and the second overall after Barbara Fusar-Poli / Maurizio Margaglio, who won the ice dancing title in 2000.

Kostner won the 2012 Europeans, her fourth continental title in ten appearances at the event. Her next competition was the 2012 International Challenge Cup, which she won by more than 26 points.

At the 2012 World Championships in Nice, France, Kostner finished third in the short program and first in the free skate with a new personal best score to take the gold. She became Italy's first World champion in ladies' singles and second in any discipline after Fusar-Poli / Margaglio in 2001. Kostner's final event of the season was the 2012 World Team Trophy, where she competed as part of the Italian team. She set a new personal best score in the short program and placed third in the free skate, finishing 2nd overall.

2012–2013 season 
Kostner was assigned to the 2012 Cup of China and the 2012 Trophee Eric Bompard. In July 2012, she said that she was considering retiring from competition but on 12 July 2012 she stated that she had decided to continue competing until the 2014 Winter Olympics in Sochi. On 2 August 2012 her name was removed from the entry lists of both of her 2012–2013 Grand Prix events due to insufficient time to reach competitive fitness. On 1 December 2012, Kostner announced on her website that she would be competing in the 2012 Golden Spin of Zagreb. At the 2013 European Championships in Zagreb, Croatia, Kostner finished second in the short program and second in the free skate with a new personal best score to take the gold, her fifth title and her eighth consecutive European medal. She then won her fifth World medal, silver, at the 2013 World Championships.

2013–2014 season 
In June 2013, Kostner began training for the 2013–2014 season in Oberstdorf. She started her season competing at the 2013 Cup of China where she won the bronze medal and then won the silver medal at the 2013 Cup of Russia. In January 2014, Kostner announced she had changed her competitive programs. At the 2014 European Championships in Budapest, Hungary, Kostner won the bronze medal, her 9th podium in a row in the continental competition.

At the 2014 Winter Olympics in Sochi, Russia, Kostner was in third place after the short program, with a score of 74.12, just 0.8 behind leader, and reigning Olympic champion, Kim Yuna of South Korea. She ultimately won the bronze medal after the free skate, with a total score of 216.73. She later said, "That night at the medal ceremony was very emotional; it was a moment when the circle closed for me and my career. I felt I missed nothing in my competitive career anymore."

One month later, at the 2014 World Championships in Saitama, Japan, Kostner placed second in the short program with a score of 77.24, her personal best. She made multiple mistakes in her free skate, where she placed sixth, and finished in third place.

2014 to 2016: Hiatus and suspension
In the summer of 2014 Kostner announced via social media that she would be taking a break from figure skating for the 2014–2015 season.

In January 2015, Kostner received a 16-month suspension from competition for lying about the location of her ex-boyfriend Alex Schwazer, reportedly to help him conceal his use of an illegal performance-enhancing hypobaric chamber machine and to help him avoid a drug test. On 5 October 2015, the Court of Arbitration for Sport (CAS) announced Kostner had agreed to a demand by Italian doping officials to increase the suspension to 21 months but to backdate the start of the ban to 1 April 2014. Kostner was therefore eligible to compete from 1 January 2016. She participated in an ISU sanctioned pro-am competition, Medal Winners Open, in January 2016.

2016–2017 season 
In November 2016, Kostner announced her intention to return to competitive skating with Alexei Mishin as her coach. She stated, "I don't feel any interest in other medals or results, really. But I feel a deep interest in learning what I've not learned yet. That's why I asked Mr. Mishin if I could train with him, at times."

She made her season debut at the 2016 CS Golden Spin of Zagreb, winning the gold medal. She was awarded the bronze medal at the 2017 European Championships in Ostrava, Czech Republic. At the 2017 World Championships in Helsinki, Finland, Kostner placed 8th in the short program, 5th in the free program and 6th overall.

2017–2018 season 
Kostner's assigned events for the 2017-18 Grand Prix series were the NHK Trophy and the Rostelecom Cup. She finished 2nd at both events, qualifying her for the Grand Prix Final, where she was fourth. In January 2018, she won her 11th medal at the European Championships, a bronze, an event record for a singles skater.

At the 2018 Olympic Games, Kostner competed in the team event and contributed to Italy's fourth place finish, placing second in the short program and fourth in the long program, In the individual ladies' event, she placed sixth in the short program and fifth in the long program, finishing fifth overall. After the competition, she was selected as the flag bearer for the closing ceremonies. In an interview, she announced her intention to compete at the World Championships, held in Milan, and stated that she had not yet decided when she would retire from competitive skating.

Kostner skated a new personal best score of 80.27 in the short program at the 2018 World Championships, taking first place. In the free skate, however, she made several errors, popping two jumps and falling on an attempted triple Salchow. As a result, she finished fifth in the free skate and fourth overall.

2018–2019 season 
In September, Kostner withdrew from the Japan Open. In October, she withdrew from both of her Grand Prix events – 2018 Grand Prix of Helsinki and 2018 Internationaux de France – due to pain in her left hip and inflammation of the proximal tendon of the "left rectus femoris muscle".

At the end of December, she broke the silence to announce that she was still struggling with the after effects of her hip injury and wouldn't go to the Europeans, but aimed at appearing at the Worlds in March. Later, she announced that she would not be competing at the 2019 World Figure Skating Championships.

Skating technique

Kostner spins and jumps in the clockwise direction. She has performed triple-triple combinations in competition, including 3F–3T, 3F–3T–2Lo, 3Lz-3T, 3T-3T, 2A-1EU-3S and 2A-3T.

Endorsements and shows
Kostner's current and former sponsors include Alto Adige/Südtirol, Asics, Grissin Bon, Lancia, Herbalife (from 2010–11 season), Torino Olympic park, and Roberto Cavalli (until 2009–10 season). Kostner's current and former official suppliers include Maybelline, L'Oréal Professionnel, Fratelli Rossetti, Damiani, Swarovski, Iceberg, and T-SHIRT T-SHOPS.

Kostner designed her own costumes from 2010 to 2014. She worked with Roberto Cavalli in 2005. She performed in the show Winx On Ice from November 2008 and in Opera on Ice, held in October 2011 at the Arena of Verona, which was broadcast simultaneously in 40 countries worldwide.

Programs

Competitive highlights
GP: Grand Prix; CS: Challenger Series; JGP: Junior Grand Prix

Detailed results

Small medals for short program and free skating awarded only at ISU Championships. At team events, medals awarded only for team results.

References

External links

 Official website
 
 
 
 

1987 births
Living people
Sportspeople from Bolzano
Italian female single skaters
Olympic figure skaters of Italy
Figure skaters at the 2006 Winter Olympics
Figure skaters at the 2010 Winter Olympics
Figure skaters at the 2014 Winter Olympics
Figure skaters at the 2018 Winter Olympics
Figure skaters of Fiamme Azzurre
World Figure Skating Championships medalists
European Figure Skating Championships medalists
World Junior Figure Skating Championships medalists
Olympic bronze medalists for Italy
Olympic medalists in figure skating
Medalists at the 2014 Winter Olympics
Season-end world number one figure skaters
Season's world number one figure skaters
Ladin people